Johann Justus Georg Gustav von Rauch (1 April 1774, in Braunschweig – 2 April 1841, in Berlin) was a Prussian general of the infantry and Minister of War from 1837 to 1841.

Life 
Gustav von Rauch was born as the eldest son of the later Prussian major general Bonaventura von Rauch (1740–1814) and his wife Johanna, née Bandel (1752–1828). 

As a close collaborator of General Gerhard von Scharnhorst, Rauch belonged to the circle of Prussian army reformers. He was associated with the reform of the military education system, the further development of the Prussian fortifications and the reorganization of the engineering and pioneering systems. Rauch furthered the development of the Prussian Navy and had the first medical companies set up in the Prussian army. He was chief of staff from 1812–1813 and Inspector General of all fortresses and Chief of the Corps of Engineers from 1814–1837. He became the 16th honorary citizen of Berlin. 

The memorial grave of Gustav von Rauch can be found in Berlin's Invalids' Cemetery (fully reconstructed after the German reunification).

Marriage and issue 
From 1802 Rauch was initially married to Caroline von Geusau (1780–1867). After their divorce Rosalie von Holtzendorff (1790–1862) became his second wife in 1816.

His first marriage produced one son:

 Adolf von Rauch (1805–1877), Prussian Chamberlain to Princess Louise of Prussia, major in the Gardes du Corps regiment and chairman of the Berlin Numismatic Society, married in 1836 to Therese von Ziegler (1817–1857)

Children of the second marriage are:

 Gustav Waldemar (1819–1890), Prussian general of the cavalry and head of the Royal Prussian State Gendarmerie, married in 1848 to Polyxena von Stéritsch (1823–1859) (from Russian nobility)
 Rosalie (1820–1879), lady-in-waiting to Princess Marianne of Prussia, in 1853 married to Prince Albrecht of Prussia, the youngest brother of King Frederick William IV of Prussia and William I, German Emperor  (as his second, morganatic wife, named Countess of Hohenau)
 Fedor (1822–1892), Chief Equerry to the German Emperors, vice-president of the Union-Klub in Berlin, married in 1856 to Countess Elisabeth von Waldersee (1837–1914), lady-in-waiting to Grand Duchess consort Marie von Mecklenburg-Strelitz
 Albert (1829–1901), Prussian general of the infantry and head of the Royal Prussian State Gendarmerie, married in 1866 to Elisabeth von Bismarck-Briest (1845–1923)

Bibliography

 Leopold von Zedlitz-Neukirch: Neues Preussisches Adels-Lexicon (New Lexicon of the Prussian Nobility), volume 4, 1837, p. 88.

 Ernst Heinrich Kneschke: Neues allgemeines deutsches Adels-Lexicon (New General Lexicon of the German Nobility), volume 7, 1867, p. 358

 Brünner Genealogisches Taschenbuch der Ritter- und Adels-Geschlechter (Brünn Genealogical Handbook of Knightly and Noble Families), 1870–1894.

 Adelslexikon in der Reihe Genealogisches Handbuch des Adels (Lexicon of the Nobility from the Genealogical Handbook of the Nobility Series), volumes XI and XII, 2000/2001, p. 192 and p. 367, respectively.

 Gothaisches Adliges Taschenbuch (Gotha Almanac Peerage Paperback), volumes B 1928 (older genealogy), p. 468 et seqq., and 1939, p. 480 et seqq.

 Genealogisches Handbuch des Adels (Almanach de Gotha), volumes B VII (1965), p. 335 etseqq., and B XXI (1995), p. 434 et seqq.
 Jacek Jędrysiak: Prussian Strategic Thought 1815–1830: Beyond Clausewitz, Leiden 2020: Brill Academic Publishers. ISBN 978-90-04-43842-2. p. 469 et seq.

1774 births
1841 deaths
Military personnel from Braunschweig
Generals of Infantry (Prussia)
Knights of the Military Order of Max Joseph
Prussian commanders of the Napoleonic Wars
Gustav
Recipients of the Pour le Mérite (military class)